Brezzo di Bedero is a comune (municipality) in the Province of Varese in the Italian region Lombardy, located about  northwest of Milan and about  northwest of Varese.

Brezzo di Bedero borders the following municipalities: Brissago-Valtravaglia, Cannero Riviera, Germignaga, Oggebbio, Porto Valtravaglia.

References

Cities and towns in Lombardy